Mimatimura is a genus of beetles in the family Cerambycidae, containing the following species:

 Mimatimura rufescens Breuning, 1939
 Mimatimura subferruginea (Gressitt, 1951)

References

Apomecynini
Taxa named by Stephan von Breuning (entomologist)